The 2005-06 FAW Premier Cup was the ninth season of the tournament since its founding in 1997.

First round

Second round

Quarter finals

Semi finals

Final

References

2005-06
2005–06 in Welsh football cups